In a BDSM context, a collar is a device of any material worn by a person to indicate their submissive or slave status in a BDSM relationship. A person wearing a collar to symbolize their relationship with another is said to be collared. Some people conduct formal "collaring ceremonies", which are regarded as effectively solemnizing their relationship in a similar way as a marriage ceremony and the collar having similar significance as a wedding ring. The standard form of a collar is a black leather band around the neck, often with metal D-rings added to allow the attachment of a leash, rope or other restraints. Some people may wear an ordinary choker or jewellery necklace instead.

Collars may be used in role-playing games involving erotic humiliation because they have connotations of control and pet-like status, especially when worn with a leash.

Construction and appearance 

The most common material for a collar is leather, and many people use actual dog collars with a buckle. Other materials include rubber, PVC, and metal (typically stainless steel). Many collars are constructed with several different materials, and may also be decorated in various ways. Collars often feature buckles, straps and hooks, padlocks and other attachments.

Wolf collars

A wolf collar is a collar fitted with spikes, studs, or nails, which in the BDSM context are decorative. The name may originate from the use of such collars to protect dogs from wolves. The spikes are considered to be dangerous, and such collars are used with care. Some wolf collars have the spikes coated in plastic for added protection.

Neck corset

A neck corset is a type of posture collar that incorporates stays. It is a corset-like device designed for the neck instead of the waist, but usually it is not used to compress the neck in the way that a normal corset compresses the waist, except in breathplay.

Stays incorporated in a neck corset are specially made shorter, used to support the weight of the head on the shoulders, while its corset structure helps in maintaining posture by keeping the chin high and the neck extended. It is often combined with a traditional corset in order to achieve better posture.

Some neck corsets and posture collars are designed to also cover the mouth. These devices, often called mouth corsets, are primarily used in BDSM because they can be used as a gag.

Social significance

Collars can have varying degrees of significance for people in the BDSM community. A person wearing a collar may wish by doing so to make it known that they are submissive. Wearing a collar may similarly be a signal to others that the submissive is "owned" by or is in a relationship with a dominant. It may also be a potently tangible symbol of the relationship itself or of the ownership the submissive is held in. A lockable collar may further symbolize a transfer of power from the submissive to the dominant holding the key.

Some submissives may not wear their collars all the time. Many choose to wear a collar only when in private with their partners, or with other members of the BDSM community.

Collars can be made from lighter materials such as cotton, or heavier materials such as leather. Steel collars are also worn by some and lockable (metal) necklaces are also regarded as a form of collar.

Other wearers of collars
Although in many instances collars are worn solely by a submissive partner in a relationship with a dominant, in some cases the dominant partner or an unattached person may also wear a collar. People often wear casual collars, purely for fashion. Collars used for fashion are worn by both men and women, and made from various materials such as soft leather, cotton, neoprene, nylon etc. often in bright friendly colors but varying from bright, neutral into darker colors. The lining ranges from bare leather to lambskin, to faux fur. The collar most often has a buckle either in black, nickel, or brass design, but snaps and velcro closures are also found.

In more mainstream culture and especially in pornography, images depicting women wearing collars are common regardless of whether these women are intended to be depicted as submissive or dominant.

Collars and other alternative clothing can also be found in certain subcultures such as goth, punk, heavy metal, Japanese anime and manga culture, otherkin or the furry fandom. These collars can vary wildly.

Collar etiquette
In some social groups, one may be expected to follow certain rules regarding a collared person. A dominant may ask if the submissive wants to be collared. Contrarily, the submissive may be asked to "earn" the collar by proving themselves worthy of wearing it. The collar itself is often affixed by the dominant and treated as a symbol of highest care. In those social groups, only the "dominant" is supposed to affix and remove the collar.

See also
Limits
Contract
Negotiation
Consent
Scene

References

External links

BDSM equipment
Fetish clothing
Neckwear

de:Halsband#BDSM